A flushing hydrant is a hydrant that is used for flushing a water line of silt, rust, debris, or stagnant water. Many water utilities use standard fire hydrants for flushing their lines. Specialized flushing hydrants are often smaller and less expensive than a fire hydrant to reduce cost where fire fighting use is not needed or practical. Flushing hydrants typically only have one outlet, in contrast to fire hydrants, which normally have two or three. Flushing hydrants are commonly installed at the end of dead-end water lines.

See also
Fire hydrant

References

Water
Drinking water
Water industry